Tudela, officially the Municipality of Tudela,  is a 5th class municipality in the province of Cebu, Philippines. According to the 2020 census, it has a population of 11,304 people.

Along with the town of Poro, Tudela is located on Poro Island. The town celebrates the fiesta of parish patron Our Lady of the Immaculate Conception each 8 December.

The town center comprises two barangays: Northern and Southern Poblacion. The nearly symmetrical arrangement of the streets allows pedestrians to navigate easily while viewing old houses (early 1900s) standing side by side with new ones.

Tudela is bordered to the north by the Province of Leyte in the Camotes Sea, to the west is the town of Poro, to the east is the island of Ponson with town of Pilar and the Province of Leyte, and to the south is the Camotes Sea

Geography

Barangays 
Tudela is politically subdivided into 11 barangays.

Climate

Demographics

Local dialect is Cebuano. Waray is also spoken due to its proximity to Leyte.

The town is home to the Porohanon language, one of the most endangered languages in the Visayas. The language is only used in the Poro islands. The language is classified as distinct from Cebuano (Bisaya) by the Komisyon ng Wikang Filipino and is vital to the culture and arts of the Porohanon people.

Economy

Transportation 
Tudela may be reached by boat through Poro port. A boat (called Jomalia) typically takes 2 hours from Danao pier. A fast craft (called Ocean Jet) takes 2 hours from Pier 1, Cebu City. Motorcycles, tricycles and jeepneys are available for ground transportation on arrival.

References

External links
 [ Philippine Standard Geographic Code]

Municipalities of Cebu